The Grace Hudson Museum in Ukiah, California, is adjacent to the Sun House which artist Grace Hudson and her husband John designed and had built in 1911. Today the house and museum are owned and operated by the city of Ukiah. The Sun House, a Craftsman style house constructed of redwood, is listed on the National Register of Historic Places.

History

After working in Oklahoma Territory in 1904-1906, Grace and John Hudson returned to Ukiah, California. There they designed and built what became known as The Sun House in 1911. It was a Craftsman-style California bungalow made of redwood. The Hudsons adopted the Hopi sun symbol as their own and displayed the symbol over the front door. They led a modest bohemian lifestyle of collecting, traveling, field work, reading, entertaining, photography and painting. John Hudson died at The Sun House in 1936, and Grace in 1937. 

They had no children. Grace Hudson bequeathed The Sun House and its land to her nephew, Mark Carpenter. Carpenter preserved the house and its 30,000 collected objects for posterity, giving it to the City of Ukiah. The house is listed on the National Register of Historic Places and designated California Historical Landmark #926. The Sun House and Museum are operated by the city within its  Hudson-Carpenter park. The museum's website says of Grace Hudson, "...her work enjoys renewed interest and recognition for its fine and sympathetic portrayals of native peoples."

Gallery

See also
 List of single-artist museums
 List of Museums in the North Coast (California)

References

External links

Official site

Museums in Mendocino County, California
Native American museums in California
Artists' studios in the United States
Hudson, Grace
Art museums and galleries in California
Hudson
Houses completed in 1911
Ukiah, California